Thomas Arthur Rogers (May 5, 1902 – May 25, 1976) was an American college football player and coach. He served as the head coach at Denison University from 1935 to 1941, compiling a record of 36–18.

References

External links
 

1902 births
1976 deaths
American football halfbacks
Denison Big Red baseball coaches
Denison Big Red football coaches
Denison Big Red football players
People from Washington Court House, Ohio